Amy Van Nostrand (born April 11, 1953) is an American actress. She has appeared on Broadway in The Hothouse by Harold Pinter; off-Broadway, she appeared in Pearl Theatre's Dance With Me.

Early years
Van Nostrand was born in Providence, Rhode Island.

Career
On Broadway, Van Nostrand appeared as Miss Cutts in The Hothouse. She has worked with many regional theatres including Huntington Theatre Company, George Street Playhouse, Williamstown Theatre Festival, Coast Playhouse, Pittsburgh Public Theater, Trinity Rep, Weston Playhouse Theatre Company, and The People's Light & Theatre Company.

In film and television her credits include Partners in Crime, Outside Providence, Execution of Justice, Say You’ll Be Mine, Deception, The House of Mirth, Made in Heaven, The Fugitive, Frasier, The Practice, Wings, Trial By Jury, Dangerous Heart, Almost Grown, Over My Dead Body, L.A. Law, Cagney and Lacey, The Flood, Kids Like These, Vietnam War Stories, Family Album, U.S.A., and  One Life to Live.

Amy Van Nostrand is an Associate Producer with Seven Girlfriends and a Member of Board of Directors for Weston Playhouse Theatre Company.

She won the Dramalogue Award for Outstanding Actress for The Colorado Catechism by Vincent J. Cardinal.

She has a B.A. from Brown University and studied as a Peter Kaplan Fellow at Trinity Repertory.

Personal life
Amy Van Nostrand married actor Tim Daly in 1982, and they divorced in 2010. They have two children, Sam Daly and Emelyn Daly.

Selected filmography

Feature films

Television

Producer credits

Theatre

Broadway

Off-Broadway

Other Stage Credits

Awards

References

External links
 
 

Living people
1953 births
Brown University alumni
American stage actresses
American film actresses
American television actresses
Actors from Providence, Rhode Island
Actresses from Rhode Island
20th-century American actresses
21st-century American actresses
Lincoln School (Providence, Rhode Island) alumni